Peter Barrington Best  (1939 - 22 April 2015) was an English marine biologist known for his research on whales and dolphins of Southern Africa. He was described as the world's foremost authority on the whales and dolphins of the Southern African region.

Best was an Extraordinary Professor and Head of the Whale Unit at the Mammal Research Institute of the University of Pretoria. He was well known for his work on whales and dolphins but also studied seals.

He is credited with initiating research into Southern right whales in the Southern African region in 1969 and of starting the on-going annual aerial survey of these whales in 1979.

From 1971 Best made recommendations to the Minister of Environmental Affairs on South Africa's policies relating to whaling and conservation of whales on behalf of the department of Marine and Coastal Management.

Education and career 

Best was born in London in 1939 and was educated at Bradfield College in Berkshire, England, matriculating in 1957. He spent two summers at the Antarctic whaling factory Balaena as a chemist's assistant. He spent a winter at the Saldanha Bay whaling station near Cape Town where he collected biological specimens including those for the Bryde's whale.

He then went to Cambridge University where he earned a BA Honours in 1962, after which he worked as a whale researcher with the Fisheries Development Corporation of South Africa (abolished in 1987, now part of the DAFF) in Cape Town until 1969. He was awarded a PhD from Cambridge in 1971 based on the data he collected during this time. His thesis was titled Studies of South African Cetacea with special reference to the sperm whale (Physeter catodon). This was one of the first degrees awarded by Cambridge for fieldwork done elsewhere.

From 1969 to 1984 he worked at the Sea Fisheries Research Institute in Cape Town, a Professional Officer, later Senior Professional Officer and finally Chief Professional Officer. He then joined the Mammal Research Institute of the University of Pretoria in 1985, working first as an Antarctic/Senior Research Officer between 1985 and 2004 and extraordinary professor from 2004 onward.

Field research 
Best conducted extensive field research including specimen collections from the Antarctic and from South African whaling stations; whale marking surveys off the South African and Indian coasts; aerial surveys of Southern right whales (personally conducted between 1969 and 2004 and supervised until 2014); and surveys of fur seals off the Namibian and west South African coast. He was also involved in surveys of migrating humpback whales, photo-identification of Heaviside's dolphins, and southern right whale feeding patterns.

Memberships, awards, recognition 
Best was a member of and recognised by several organisations, including:
 Elected a Fellow of the Royal Society of South Africa in 2004
 Charter member of the Society of Marine Mammalogy
 Awarded the Cape Times Centenary Medal (1993)
 Gold medal of the Zoological Society of Southern Africa (1998)
 Gilchrist Memorial Medal (2005)
 Commemorative Research Medal, University of Pretoria (2008)

He was a member of several research committees, including:
 International Whaling Commission (1971-1983 on Scientific committee)
 Chaired several sub-committees on endangered whales species, humpback whales and Minke whales
 International Union for Conservation of Nature (IUCN) / Species Survival Commission (SSC) Group of Specialists on Whales (1971-1975)
 IUCN / SSC Group of Specialists on Seals (1983 - 1986)
 IUCN / SSC Group of Specialists on Cetaceans (1985- )
 Committee of Scientific Advisors of the Society for Marine Mammalogy (2003- )

Between 1985 and 1995, Best acted as associate editor of Marine Mammal Science.

In 2007, Best was conference chair for 17th Biennial Conference on the Biology of Marine Mammals in Cape Town.

Selected publications 
Best published more than 160 academic papers in peer-reviewed journals, wrote more than 20 articles in popular works and authored 3 books, including:

Books

Journal publications

Personal life 
Best married Margaret Ann Ralph in June 1974 and they had two children, Robert and Alison.

References

External links 
 Peter B. Best journal articles and data at ResearchGate
 Peter B. Best at Semantic Scholar

1939 births
2015 deaths
Cetologists
Scientists from London
British mammalogists
20th-century South African zoologists
Alumni of the University of Cambridge
Academic staff of the University of Pretoria
Fellows of the Royal Society of South Africa
20th-century British zoologists